Vincent Taylor (born January 5, 1994) is an American football defensive tackle for the Atlanta Falcons of the National Football League (NFL). He played college football at Oklahoma State. Taylor has played professionally for the Miami Dolphins, Buffalo Bills, Cleveland Browns, and Houston Texans.

Early years
Taylor was born in New Orleans, Louisiana and moved to San Antonio, Texas after his family's home was destroyed in Hurricane Katrina. He attended James Madison High School in San Antonio. As a senior, he recorded 79 tackles and two sacks. Taylor committed to Oklahoma State University to play college football.

College career
After redshirting his first year at Oklahoma State in 2013, Taylor appeared in 10 games as a redshirt freshman in 2014, recording 13 tackles. As a sophomore in 2015, he started all 13 games and had 48 tackles and five sacks. As a junior, he had 51 tackles and seven sacks and was named first-team All-Big 12. After the season, Taylor decided to forgo his senior year and enter the 2017 NFL Draft.

Professional career

Miami Dolphins
Taylor was drafted by the Miami Dolphins in the sixth round, 194th overall, in the 2017 NFL Draft. He played in 13 games as a rookie before being placed on injured reserve on December 28, 2017 with a knee injury.

In 2018, Taylor played in eight games before suffering a foot injury in Week 8. He was placed on injured reserve on October 30, 2018.

On September 2, 2019, Taylor was waived by the Dolphins.

Buffalo Bills
On September 5, 2019, Taylor was signed to the Buffalo Bills practice squad. He was promoted to the active roster on November 2, 2019.

Taylor was placed on the reserve/COVID-19 list by the Bills on July 29, 2020, and activated from the list six days later. He was waived as part of final roster cuts on September 5, 2020.

Cleveland Browns
Taylor was claimed off waivers by the Cleveland Browns on September 6, 2020.

Houston Texans
Taylor signed a one-year contract with the Houston Texans on March 22, 2021. He suffered an ankle injury in Week 1 and was placed on injured reserve on September 15, 2021.

Atlanta Falcons
On April 19, 2022, Taylor signed with the Atlanta Falcons. He suffered a ruptured Achilles during training camp practice and was placed on season-ending injured reserve on August 7, 2022.

References

External links
Oklahoma State Cowboys bio
Buffalo Bills bio

1994 births
Living people
Players of American football from New Orleans
Players of American football from San Antonio
American football defensive tackles
Oklahoma State Cowboys football players
Atlanta Falcons players
Buffalo Bills players
Cleveland Browns players
Houston Texans players
Miami Dolphins players